Ingram Micro is an American distributor of information technology products and services. The company is based in Irvine, California, U.S. and has operations around the world.

History 

Ingram Micro's origins trace back to the founding of distributor Micro D, Inc. in July 1979 by husband and wife team, Geza Czige and Lorraine Mecca, who were both teachers. The company started in Southern California and in its first year of business achieved approximately $3.5 million in sales. It rapidly expanded nationwide and held its public offering in 1983. Ingram Industries became a majority stockholder of Micro D in February 1986 when it acquired all of the common stock held by the company's founders, followed by the purchase of the remaining Micro D shares in March 1989.

Meanwhile in 1982, just three years after the founding of Micro D, entrepreneurs Ronald Schreiber, Irwin Schreiber, Gerald Lippes and Paul Willax founded Software Distribution Services in Buffalo, N.Y. Ingram Distribution Group, a unit of the privately held Ingram Industries, acquired Software Distribution Services in the spring of 1985 and renamed it Ingram Software. Ingram Software expanded in December 1985 with the purchase of Softeam, a Compton, Calif.-based distributor. The operation was renamed Ingram Computer in February 1988.

After acquiring the remaining publicly traded shares of Micro D in 1989, Ingram Industries merged these two former competitors to create the microcomputer industry's first $1 billion computer products wholesale distribution company, renaming it Ingram Micro D. The new company established headquarters in Santa Ana, Calif., and retained an East Coast operations center for sales, credit, technical support and customer service in Buffalo, N.Y. The “D” was dropped from the company's name in January 1991, creating Ingram Micro.

In 1996, 17 years after the founding of Micro D, Ingram Micro once again became a public company, listing its shares on the New York Stock Exchange (NYSE). That year, the company’s revenues totaled more than $12 billion. In 1989 Ingram Micro, then called "Ingram Micro-D", was a subsidiary of the privately owned Ingram Industries group, took over the Belgian Softinvest and its three Softeurop subsidiaries active on the Belgian, the French and the Dutch markets from Brussels, Lille and Utrecht. This was Ingram's first foray outside the United States other than a few Ingram Industries subsidiaries. The company embarked on an active merge, acquisitions and foundation strategy in the European market.

In August 1993, Ingram Micro Belgium acquired Zaventem Electronic Dealer Distribution (Zedd) and much of its assets, including the right to distribute Hewlett Packard products.

In July 2005 Ingram Micro purchased AVAD, LLC, a wholesale distributor for home automation and A/V gear.  It sold this subsidiary in July 2016.

The Shared Services Center in Manila, Philippines, began operations in May 2009.

Ingram Micro built a presence in areas adjacent to its traditional distribution business, including enterprise computing, automatic identification and data capture (AIDC); point-of-sale (POS); managed, professional and warranty maintenance services; mobility; physical security; and consumer electronics.

Other ventures in 2014 included entry into cloud computing, or software-, platform- and infrastructure-as-a-service.

In June 2014, Ingram Micro changed their logo and introduced a new tagline: "Ingram Micro helps businesses realize the promise of technology".

In December 2015, Ingram Micro acquired Odin Service Automation platform from Parallels for $163.9 million.

In February 2016, Ingram Micro announced its agreement to be acquired by the Chinese company Tianjin Tianhai Investment, an associate company of mega-conglomerate HNA Group, for $6 billion; upon completion, Ingram Micro would become part of Tianjin Tianhai Investment and therefore a subsidiary of HNA Group. It was reported at the time that Alain Monié, Ingram's chief executive, would remain in place. HNA Group director Tan Xiangdong was elected onto the 7-man board of directors of Ingram Micro. The transaction reportedly made Ingram the biggest revenue generator for HNA Group.  The strategic reason for the transaction was to better reach "business opportunities in emerging markets, which have higher growth rates and better profitability."  HNA Group's logistics and its presence in China was intended to help Ingram's growth. The acquisition was completed in December 2016.

In October 2017, Ingram Micro partnered with DocuSign. In December 2017, Ingram Micro acquired Cloud Harmonics, expanding its cyber security capabilities. In May 2018, Ingram Micro formed CloudBlue.

In December 2020, Platinum Equity announced its intent to acquire Ingram Micro from HNA Technology Co. in an all-cash transaction with an equity value of approximately US$7.2 billion. The transaction completed in July 2021.

In December 2021, CEVA Logistics, a subsidiary of CMA CGM, announced plans to buy Ingram Micro CLS; Ingram's Third Party Logistics arm.

Notable employees
Former U.S. Congressman Chris Lee once worked at Ingram Micro.

Bülent Ural, who currently works as a sales consultant for Ingram Micro's German branch, was a member of the German-Turkish musical group Sürpriz, which represented Germany in the Eurovision Song Contest in 1999.

References

See also 
 Competitor Tech Data
 Competitor CDW
 Competitor Synnex

American companies established in 1979
Software companies established in 1979
Computer companies of the United States
Electronics companies of the United States
Manufacturing companies based in California
Software companies based in California
Technology companies based in Greater Los Angeles
Companies based in Santa Ana, California
Computer companies established in 1979
Electronics companies established in 1979
1979 establishments in California
Ingram family
2016 mergers and acquisitions
2021 mergers and acquisitions
Companies formerly listed on the New York Stock Exchange
HNA Group
1996 initial public offerings
Software companies of the United States
Private equity portfolio companies